Pouteria orinocoensis is a species of plant in the family Sapotaceae. It is endemic to Venezuela.

References

Flora of Venezuela
orinocoensis
Least concern plants
Taxonomy articles created by Polbot
Taxa named by André Aubréville